Yanping West railway station is a railway station in Xiqin town, Yanping District, Nanping, Fujian, China.

History
During construction of the station, a tomb was discovered. A new bridge was constructed across the Min River for access to the station.

The station opened with the Nanping–Longyan railway on 29 December 2018. The Nanping–Fuzhou railway was rerouted slightly and now passes through the station.

References 

Railway stations in Fujian
Railway stations in China opened in 2018